Highway 55 (MT 55) in the U.S. State of Montana is a route running in a northerly direction from an intersection with MT 41 about  north of the small town of Silver Star. The route traverses largely agricultural land in the Jefferson River valley.

Route description
Highway 55 begins at MT 41, north of Silver Star. Concurrent with Montana Highway 287, it intersects Cut Across Road. An intersection with Waterloo Road is not far off as Highway 55 proceeds northward. From the west intersects Jack Rabbit Lane, before intersecting Fish Creek Road. It intersects Airport Lane before intersecting Cape Lane. After intersecting several small roads, Highway 55 ends at I-90 at Whitehall.

History
Before receiving its current designation, Highway 55 was designated as part of Montana Highway 287.  A small segment of Highway 55 in Whitehall was a former alignment of U.S. Route 10, before U.S. 10 was deleted across Montana.

Major intersections

References

 

055
Transportation in Madison County, Montana
Transportation in Silver Bow County, Montana
Transportation in Jefferson County, Montana
U.S. Route 10